Qomolangma National Park is a national park located in Xigazê Prefecture, Tibet Autonomous Region, China. Mount Qomolangma is the Tibetan and Chinese name for Mount Everest.  The park, opened in 2012, occupies 78,000 square kilometres, and contains mountains of altitudes ranging from 7,000 to 8,848 metres.

The number of visitors to the area rose from 13,374 in 2008 to 73,000 in 2012, according to figures provided by the Dingri county tourism bureau. In 2008, the zone received 2,698 foreign tourists, but by 2010 a record 18,700 foreigners visited the area, the highest number for five years.

References

External links

National parks of China